Sabina Oroszová (born June 5, 1993) is a Slovak basketball player for Piešťanské Čajky and the Slovak national team.

She participated at the EuroBasket Women 2017.

References

1993 births
Living people
Slovak women's basketball players
Sportspeople from Bratislava
Power forwards (basketball)